This list of bird species introduced to the Hawaiian Islands includes only those species known to have established self-sustaining breeding populations as a direct or indirect result of human intervention. A complete list of all non-native species ever imported to the islands, including those that never became established, would be much longer. In the following list, ^ indicates a species indigenous to the Hawaiian Islands but introduced to an area or areas outside its known native range, * indicates a formerly established population that is now extirpated, and parenthetical notes describe the specific islands where each species is known to be established.

Cattle egret (most of the larger islands)
Mallard (throughout)
Wild turkey (Hawaii, Lanai, Maui, Molokai, and Niihau)
California quail
Gambel's quail (Lanai and Kahoolawe)
Chukar (all main islands from Kauai eastward, except Oahu)
Black francolin (Hawaii, Kauai, Maui, and Molokai; possibly extirpated)
Gray francolin (Hawaii, Lanai, Maui, Molokai, and Oahu)
Erckel's spurfowl (all main islands from Kauai eastward, except Maui)
Red junglefowl (Kauai and Oahu's Waimea Falls Park)
Kalij pheasant (Hawaii)
Ring-necked pheasant (all main islands from Kauai eastward)
Green pheasant (Lanai and Kauai; possibly Maui)
Common peafowl (Hawaii, Maui, and Oahu)
Chestnut-bellied sandgrouse (Hawaii)
Rock pigeon (Hawaii, Maui, Oahu)
Spotted dove (all main islands from Kauai eastward)
Zebra dove (all main islands from Kauai eastward)
Mourning dove (Hawaii, Maui)
Rose-ringed parakeet (Hawaii, Oahu, and Kauai)
Mitred parakeet (Hawaii)
Red-masked parakeet (Hawaii, O'ahu)
Red-crowned amazon (O'ahu)
Barn owl (all main islands from Kauai eastward)
Mariana swiftlet (Oahu)
Eurasian skylark (All main islands)
Red-vented bulbul (O'ahu)
Red-whiskered bulbul (O'ahu)
Japanese bush warbler (All main islands)
White-rumped shama (All main islands)
Greater necklaced laughingthrush (Kauai)
Chinese Hwamei (All main islands)
Red-billed leiothrix (Hawaii, Maui, O'ahu)
Japanese white-eye (see Japanese white-eye in Hawaii) (Hawaii, Maui, Kauai)
Northern mockingbird (All main islands)
Common myna (All main islands)
Yellow-faced grassquit (O'ahu)
Saffron finch (Hawai'i)
Red-crested cardinal (Oahu, Maui, Kauai)
Yellow-billed cardinal (Hawaii)
Northern cardinal (All main islands)
Western meadowlark (Kaua'i)
House finch (All main islands)
Common canary
Yellow-fronted canary (O'ahu, Hawaii)
Laysan finch^ (Pearl and Hermes Reef*)
House sparrow (All main islands)
Red-cheeked cordon-bleu (Hawaii)
Lavender waxbill (Hawaii, O'ahu)
Orange-cheeked waxbill (Maui, O'ahu)
Black-rumped waxbill (Hawaii)
Common waxbill (All main islands)
Red avadavat (Kauai, O'ahu)
African silverbill (All main islands)
Nutmeg mannikin (All main islands)
Chestnut munia (All main islands)
Java sparrow (Maui, Kauai, Hawaii)

Cedar waxwing (Maui)

See also
Endemic birds of Hawaii
List of introduced bird species
List of introduced species
Introduced species
List of invasive species
Invasive species

References

Sources
American Ornithologists' Union. 1998. Check-list of North American Birds. 7th edition. American Ornithologists' Union, Washington, D.C. 829 pp.
Berger, Andrew J. 1981. Hawaiian birdlife. 2nd edition. University of Hawaii Press, Honolulu. 260 pp.
Long, John L. 1971. Introduced birds of the world: the worldwide history, distribution, and influence of birds introduced to new environments. Universe Books, New York. 528 pp.

Hawaii, introduced
Birds, species
 Bird species introduced
Hawaii
Hawaii birds